The Wackiest Ship in the Army is an American comedy drama adventure television series that aired for one season on NBC between September 19, 1965, and April 17, 1966. Produced by Harry Ackerman and Herbert Hirschman, the series was loosely based on the 1960 film starring Jack Lemmon and Ricky Nelson, which itself was a fictionalized account of a real wartime vessel. 

Although often referred to as a comedy series, the show violated three unwritten rules that unofficially defined TV situation comedies at the time: It was an hour in length (almost all comedy series were only a half-hour, and the few attempts at hour sitcoms were unsuccessful), it had no laugh track, and characters were sometimes killed in it.

Synopsis
The series is set in the Pacific theater of World War II and centers on the crew of the USS Kiwi, a leaky, wooden, twin-masted schooner whose mission is to carry out covert missions behind Japanese lines. Her old-fashioned, noncombatant appearance works in her favor, and she sails under false colors (the Swiss flag) when in enemy waters. The Kiwi is jointly commanded by United States Army Major Simon Butcher (Jack Warden), who is in charge of shore operations, and United States Navy Lieutenant (junior grade) Richard "Rip" Riddle (Gary Collins), who is in command of the vessel at sea. The crew consists of:

Mike Kellin: Chief Petty Officer Willie Miller (also in the 1960 film, and listed in the series opening credits)
Mark Slade: Radioman Patrick Hollis
Fred Smoot: Machinist Mate Seymour Trivers
Rudy Solari: Gunner's Mate Sherman Nagurski
Don Penny: Pharmacist Mate Charles Tyler, ship's cook

Notable guest stars
Guest stars included:
 James Hong: Agaki (three episodes)
 Jill Ireland
 Robert Loggia
 Harry Morgan
 Chips Rafferty (also in the 1960 film)
 George Takei
 Jack Soo

Production notes
The theme music and scoring were by Nelson Riddle.

Ship
The USS Kiwi was based on the real-life , a 40-year-old schooner (or scow) that the Government of New Zealand transferred to the United States Navy  during World War II. The United States returned her to New Zealand in 1944. The Echo was broken up in 2015 due to her poor material conditioning following her use as a bar which had closed in 2013.

In other media
A paperback novelisation based on the series, by Lee Bergman, was released in 1965.

Broadcast history
The Wackiest Ship in the Army premiered on NBC on September 19, 1965. It lasted a single season, and the last of its 29 original episodes aired on April 17, 1966. Prime-time reruns of The Wackiest Ship in the Army followed in its regular time slot on NBC until September 4, 1966. The show aired at 10:00 p.m. on Sunday throughout its run.

Episode list
SOURCES Schenectady Gazette, September 18, 1965, p. 11.Schenectady Gazette, September 25, 1965, p. 20.Marshall, Andrew, The Wackiest Ship in the Army (1965): S01E03 – Goldbrickers, Military Gogglebox, January 11, 2019 Accessed 10 November 2021Schenectady Gazette, October 30, 1965, p. 17.Schenectady Gazette, November 6, 1965, p. 19.Marshall, Andrew, The Wackiest Ship in the Army (1965): S01E09 – Vive La Kiwi, Military Gogglebox, January 11, 2019 Accessed 10 November 2021Schenectady Gazette, November 27, 1965, p. 19.Schenectady Gazette, December 4, 1965, p. 13.Schenectady Gazette, December 11, 1965, p. 9.Marshall, Andrew, The Wackiest Ship in the Army (1965): S01E14 – I’m Dreaming of a Wide Isthmus, Military Gogglebox, January 11, 2019 Accessed 10 November 2021

References

External links 
 
 

1965 American television series debuts
1966 American television series endings
1960s American comedy-drama television series
English-language television shows
NBC original programming
Military comedy television series
Military humor in film
American military television series
Nautical television series
Live action television shows based on films
Television series by Sony Pictures Television
World War II television comedy series
Television shows set in Oceania
Television series by Screen Gems
Television series about the United States Navy